Zehra Ali Yavar Jung is an Indian social worker and the founder of Society For Clean Cities (SCC), a non governmental organization working for the welfare of the slum dwellers of Mumbai. She was married to Ali Yavar Jung, a diplomat and a former governor of the State of Maharashtra. She also founded the National Society for Clean Cities, a social organization which runs a children's home in Bandra where children from financially poor families are accommodated and their educational, nutritional, medical, vocational, recreational and cultural welfare are looked after. She serves as the president of the organization. The Government of India awarded her the third highest civilian honour of the Padma Bhushan, in 1973, for her contributions to society.

See also 

 Ali Yavar Jung

References 

Recipients of the Padma Bhushan in social work
Year of birth missing (living people)
Indian social workers
Social workers from Maharashtra
Living people
Tyabji family